Netz über Bord – Heringsfang auf der Nordsee (Net on board – herring fishing on the North Sea), is a 1955 German documentary about the herring fishing industry written and directed by Jürgen Roland.

Jürgen Roland and Carsten Diercks accompany fisherman at their hard work on the waters of the North Sea at the end of traditional fishing methods, just before the coming of the big trawlers.

See also
Herring Hunt, a 1953 Canadian documentary about herring fishing in British Columbia

External links 
 

1955 films
1955 documentary films
German documentary films
West German films
1950s German-language films
Films directed by Jürgen Roland
Documentary films about fishing
German black-and-white films
1950s German films